Heradi Rashidi (born 24 July 1994) is a Swedish footballer who plays for Brommapojkarna. Previously mainly a right winger or forward, since 2016 he has mainly operated as left wing-back.

Club career
On 4 July 2018, it was announced that AIK had acquired Rashidi from Dalkurd for an undisclosed fee.

On 15 July 2018, Rashidi made his debut for AIK against GIF Sundsvall away. In the last minute of added time he scored the only goal of the game, a beautiful shot in the top left corner.

On 22 January 2021, Rashidi signed for Armenian club Ararat-Armenia making seven appearances for them in all competitions before leaving the club in June 2021 when his contract wasn't renewed.

On 14 February 2022, Rashidi signed with Brommapojkarna in Superettan.

Career statistics

Club

Notes

Honours
AIK
 Allsvenskan: 2018

References

1994 births
Living people
Democratic Republic of the Congo footballers
Swedish footballers
Democratic Republic of the Congo emigrants to Sweden
Association football midfielders
Djurgårdens IF Fotboll players
IFK Stockholm players
IFK Aspudden-Tellus players
Akropolis IF players
Dalkurd FF players
Syrianska FC players
AIK Fotboll players
FC Ararat-Armenia players
IF Brommapojkarna players
Ettan Fotboll players
Superettan players
Allsvenskan players
Armenian Premier League players
Swedish expatriate footballers
Expatriate footballers in Armenia
Swedish expatriate sportspeople in Armenia